Dunch is a surname. Notable people with the surname include:

Edmund Dunch (Elizabethan) (1551–1623), English MP and High Sheriff
Edmund Dunch (Roundhead) (1602–1678), English Member of Parliament
Edmund Dunch (Whig) (1657–1719), Master of the Royal Household to Queen Anne, British Member of Parliament
Hungerford Dunch (1639–1680), English politician, member of the House of Commons in 1660 and from 1679 to 1680
John Dunch (1630–1668), English politician who sat in the House of Commons between 1654 and 1659
Samuel Dunch (1593–1668), English politician who sat in the House of Commons in 1621 and 1653
Sir William Dunch (1578–1611), English politician during the reign of King James I
William Dunch (1508–1597) (1508–1597), English politician

See also
Dench
Dhunche
Dunce